Cutcombe is a village and civil parish  south of Minehead and north of Dulverton straddling the ridge between Exmoor and the Brendon Hills in Somerset. It has a population of 361.

History

Cutcombe comes from Old English meaning Cuda's valley and was granted after the Norman Conquest to William de Mohun of Dunster.

Cutcombe was part of the hundred of Carhampton.

Cutcombe Market has been a long established livestock market. A partnership involving Somerset County Council, Exmoor National Park Authority, the South West of England Regional Development Agency and West Somerset Council put together plans to revitalise the market and add housing, industrial units and an Exmoor National Park Interpretation Centre on the site. Somerset Rural Renaissance Partnership have invested over £300,000 towards the project which was expected to complete in 2011.

Governance

The parish council has responsibility for local issues, including setting an annual precept (local rate) to cover the council's operating costs and producing annual accounts for public scrutiny. The parish council evaluates local planning applications and works with the local police, district council officers, and neighbourhood watch groups on matters of crime, security, and traffic. The parish council's role also includes initiating projects for the maintenance and repair of parish facilities, as well as consulting with the district council on the maintenance, repair, and improvement of highways, drainage, footpaths, public transport, and street cleaning. Conservation matters (including trees and listed buildings) and environmental issues are also the responsibility of the council.

The village falls within the non-metropolitan district of Somerset West and Taunton, which was established on 1 April 2019. It was previously in the district of West Somerset, which was formed on 1 April 1974 under the Local Government Act 1972, and part of Williton Rural District before that. The district council is responsible for local planning and building control, local roads, council housing, environmental health, markets and fairs, refuse collection and recycling, cemeteries and crematoria, leisure services, parks, and tourism.

Somerset County Council is responsible for running the largest and most expensive local services such as education, social services, libraries, main roads, public transport, policing and fire services, trading standards, waste disposal and strategic planning.

It is also part of the Bridgwater and West Somerset county constituency represented in the House of Commons of the Parliament of the United Kingdom. It elects one Member of Parliament (MP) by the first past the post system of election, and was part of the South West England constituency of the European Parliament prior to Britain leaving the European Union in January 2020, which elected seven MEPs using the d'Hondt method of party-list proportional representation.

Religious sites

The parish church of St John has a 13th-century tower and has been designated by English Heritage as a Grade II* listed building.

References

External links

Cutcombe village website

Exmoor
Villages in West Somerset
Civil parishes in Somerset